The 2001 Colorado Buffaloes football team represented the University of Colorado at Boulder during the 2001 NCAA Division I-A football season. The team played their home games at Folsom Field in Boulder, Colorado. They participated in the Big 12 Conference in the North Division. They were coached by head coach Gary Barnett. Colorado played in the Big 12 Championship Game for the first time and secured its first BCS bowl berth.

Schedule

Note: Colorado was scheduled to play at Washington State on September 15 but the game was canceled due to the September 11 attacks.

Roster

Game summaries

Fresno State

Colorado State

San Jose State

Kansas

Kansas State

Texas A&M Aggies

Texas

Oklahoma State

Missouri

Iowa State

Nebraska

Big 12 Championship Game

Fiesta Bowl

Rankings

Awards and honors
 Daniel Graham, TE – John Mackey Award, Consensus First-team All-American 
 Andre Gurode, G – Consensus First-team All-American
 Gary Barnett – Big 12 Coach of the Year

References

Colorado
Colorado Buffaloes football seasons
Big 12 Conference football champion seasons
Colorado Buffaloes football